Steven Shane "Steve" McDonald (born May 24, 1967) is an American rock musician, best known as the bass guitarist in the Los Angeles alternative rock/power pop band Redd Kross. He is a founding member of the hardcore punk band OFF! – serving as a member from 2009 to 2021 – as well as the current bassist for the Melvins. McDonald has appeared in numerous film projects with his older brother Jeff McDonald, including the 1984 film Desperate Teenage Lovedolls and its sequel Lovedolls Superstar; and the 1990 film Spirit of '76.

Career
Steven McDonald began his career in 1978, when he and his brother Jeff were 11 and 14 respectively. During those times, they lived in Hawthorne, California and were discovering underground music through Creem and Rock Scene magazines. Their real inspiration for the punk rock music began with Black Flag. Despite their age, The Flag added them to their member list. Soon after, they formed a band Redd Kross and performed their first show titled "Red Cross" at the eighth-grade graduation of one of their classmates.

McDonald produced an album by The Format, Dog Problems, on which he played bass and sang backup vocals on a few tracks. He later produced, engineered, and mixed fun.'s debut album, Aim and Ignite, as well as performing as a bassist and backup vocalist on some of the songs. He was also one of the various band members on the original Tenacious D album, along with Dave Grohl; keyboardist Page McConnell of Phish; guitarist Warren Fitzgerald with band frontmen Jack Black and Kyle Gass. He appeared with Tenacious D on MADtv playing "Lee" and "Tribute". McDonald also featured briefly on bass in Kyle Gass' side-project Trainwreck in 2002 and 2003, under the pseudonym "Slim Watkins", before being succeeded by John Spiker.

In the summer of 2002 he became so excited about The White Stripes' new album, White Blood Cells, that he recorded bass lines to two songs of the typically bass-less duo's work. The New York Times, Entertainment Weekly and other outlets reported on it and due to overwhelming demand he added bass to all of the songs, posted the new creation online, and allowed people to download the tracks for free. He called it an art project named Redd Blood Cells which reached a peak of 60,000 downloads in a single day, causing the server to crash from the traffic. 

In 2006, MacDonald joined Sparks on tour in support of their album Hello Young Lovers.

In 2015, it was announced that McDonald would be joining the Melvins. He recorded four songs with the band, which were first released on the limited edition EP War Pussy and later included on the album Basses Loaded. Their first full release with McDonald, a double album titled A Walk with Love & Death, was released on July 7, 2017.

McDonald co-wrote "Embrace the Rub" with his wife Anna Waronker of That Dog and Josh Klinghoffer of the Red Hot Chili Peppers.

Personal life
Steven is married to that dog. vocalist Anna Waronker.

Partial discography

Redd Kross
Red Cross (1980; EP)
Born Innocent (1982)
Teen Babes from Monsanto (1984; EP)
Neurotica (1987)
Third Eye (1990)
Phaseshifter (1993)
Show World (1997)
Researching the Blues (2012)
Beyond the Door (2019)

Off!
First Four EPs (2010)
Off! (2012)
Wasted Years (2014)

Melvins
Basses Loaded (2016; select songs)
A Walk with Love & Death (2017)
Pinkus Abortion Technician (2018)
Five Legged Dog (2021)

References

1967 births
American rock bass guitarists
American male bass guitarists
Living people
Redd Kross members
Tenacious D members
American punk rock bass guitarists
Alternative rock bass guitarists
Musicians from Hawthorne, California
Melvins members
Off! members
20th-century American guitarists
Trainwreck with Kyle Gass members